Moti Bagh Palace is a palace in Patiala, also known as Pearl Garden Palace. The word "Moti" means "pearl", and "Bagh" means "garden". The Palace was built by Maharaja Narinder Singh, the great-grandfather of Maharaja Bhupinder Singh,  in 1847, at a cost of five lakhs of rupees. The Old Moti Bagh Palace and New Moti Bagh Palace were built respectively by  Maharaja Narinder Singh (reigned 1845–62) and Maharaja Yadavindra Singh.

The Old Palace is one of the largest residencies in Asia, housing the Netaji Subhas National Institute of Sports (NIS) currently. And the New Moti Bagh Palace is the residence of Former Chief Minister of Punjab Captain Amarinder Singh currently.

History 
It was expanded in 1920s under the supervision of Sir Ganga Ram during the reign of Maharaja Bhupinder Singh. After independence, the Government of India took over the premises, and later converted it into a museum, a taxidermy gallery, and the North Zone Cultural Centre.

The National Institute of Sports (NIS) Patiala is situated in its East wing, where the annual Patiala Heritage festival is celebrated. 

There is another building, called the New Moti Bagh Palace, built in 1959, that is residence of Amarinder Singh.

Architecture 
The Palace incorporates Indian and European architectural features.

Gallery

References

External links 

 Article at the Punjab Tourism website

Palaces in Punjab, India
Royal residences in India
Tourist attractions in Patiala
Sikh architecture